Kennedia coccinea, commonly known as coral vine, is a species of flowering plant in the family Fabaceae and is endemic to the south-west of Western Australia. It is a twining, climbing or prostrate shrub with trifoliate leaves and orange-pink, red and pink, pea-like flowers.

Description

Taxonomy
This species was first formally described in 1794 by William Curtis who gave it the name Glycine coccinea in his Botanical Magazine from plants raised "in the neighbourhood of London from Botany-Bay seeds". In 1805, Étienne Pierre Ventenat changed the name to Kennedia coccinea in his book Jardin de la Malmaison. The specific epithet (coccinea) means "scarlet".

Two varieties, elegans and coccinea were described in Paxton's Magazine of Botany in 1835, and a further three varieties molly, sericea and villosawere transferred from the genus Zichya in 1923 by Czech botanist Karel Domin. All five of these varieties are now regarded as synonyms of K. coccinea by the Australian Plant Census.

In 2010, Terena R. Lally described three subspecies of K. coccinea and the names are accepted by the Australian Plant Census:
 Kennedia coccinea subsp. calcaria Lally is a prostrate or scrambling shrub with flowers in groups of thirteen to thirty or more, growing on sand in coastal heath;
 Kennedia coccinea (Curtis) Vent.  subsp. coccinea is a twining or scrambling shrub with flowers in groups of thirteen to thirty or more, growing in forest;
 Kennedia coccinea subsp. esotera Lally is a prostrate shrub with flowers in groups of three to twelve.

Distribution and habitat
Subspecies calcaria grows in sand over limestone in coastal heath between Jurien Bay and Albany, subsp. coccinea in forest and woodland in a wide area between Northam Augusta and Albany, and subsp. esotera in open forest, mallee-heath or scrub, often in disturbed areas, from near Eneabba to Albany and Israelite Bay.

Conservation status
All three subspecies of K. coccinea are listed as "not threatened" by the Government of Western Australia Department of Biodiversity, Conservation and Attractions.

Use in horticulture
The species is naturally adapted to sandy or lighter soils and prefers some shade. It is resistant to drought and has some frost tolerance. Plants can be propagated by scarified seed or cuttings of semi-mature growth.

References

Fabales of Australia
Plants described in 1804
Rosids of Western Australia
coccinea
Taxa named by Étienne Pierre Ventenat
Endemic flora of Southwest Australia